New Zealand consists of more than six hundred islands, mainly remnants of a larger land mass now beneath the sea. New Zealand is the seventh-largest island country, and the third-largest located entirely in the Southern Hemisphere. The following is a list of islands of New Zealand.

The two largest islands – where most of the human population lives – have names in both English and in the Māori language. They are the North Island or Te Ika-a-Māui and the South Island or Te Waipounamu. Various Māori iwi sometimes use other names, with some preferring to call the South Island Te Waka o Aoraki. The two islands are separated by the Cook Strait. In general practice, the term mainland refers to the North Island and South Island. However, the South Island alone is sometimes called "the mainland" – especially by its residents, as a nickname – because it is the larger of the two main islands.

To the south of the South Island, Stewart Island / Rakiura is the largest of the smaller islands, and Waiheke Island in the urban Auckland Region has the largest population of the smaller islands.

Listed by size
The following table lists the largest islands of New Zealand  by area. The country's largest island within a lake, Pomona Island, has an area of just .

Listed by highest point

The following table lists the islands of New Zealand by their highest elevation. These islands are all in harbours or the open sea.

In harbours and the open sea

Aiguilles Island
Aldermen Islands
Allports Island
Amerikiwhati Island
Anatakupu Island
Anchor Island
Anchorage Island
Aorangaia Island
Araara Island
Arakaninihi Island
Arapaoa Island
Aroha Island
Aua / King Billy Island 
Awarua Rock
Bauza Island
Bells Island
Bench Island
Bests Island
Blumine Island / Ōruawairua
Breaksea Island
The Brothers
Browns Island (Motukorea)
Calliope Island, Whangarei Heads
Catherine Island, Charles Sound
Cavalli Islands
Chalky Island

Chetwode Islands
Coal Island
Codfish Island / Whenua Hou
Cooper Island
Dog Island
Cuvier Island
Dragon Island
Eleanor Island, Charles Sound
Elizabeth Island
Fanny Island, Charles Sound
Fisherman Island
Forsyth Island
Frenchman Island, Whangarei Heads
Goat Island / Rakiriri
Great Barrier Island/Aotea
Great Island
Green Island (Okaihe)
Green Island
Guano Island, Whangarei Heads
Hen and Chicken Islands
High Island
Herald Island
Horomaka Island
Indian Island
Kaikōura Island
Kapiti Island
Kārewa / Gannet Island
Karewa Island
Kawau Island
Kopuahingahinga Island, Manukau Harbour
Long Island, Marlborough
Long Island (Southland)
Mahurangi Island (Goat Island)
Mākaro / Ward Island
Mana Island
Matakana Island
Matapara / Pickersgill Island
Matiu / Somes Island
Maud Island/Te Hoiere
Mauitaha Island, Whangarei Heads
Mayor Island / Tūhua
Mercury Islands
Mokohinau Islands
Mokopuna Island
Mōtītī Island
Motuara Island
Motuareronui / Adele Island
Motuarohia Island
Motueka Island (Pigeon Island)
Motuhoa Island, Tauranga Harbour
Motuihe Island
Motukaroro Island
Motukawao Islands
Motukiore Island, Parua Bay
Motukōkako Island / Piercy Island
Motu Matakohe / Limestone Island
Motunau Island 
Motuora
Motuoroi Island
Moturaka Island
Moturoa / Rabbit Island
Moturekareka Island
Motutapu Island
Moutohora Island/Whale Island
Native Island
Ngarango Otainui Island
Ngā Motu / Sugar Loaf Islands
Ninepin Rock, Manukau Harbour
Noble Island
North Island
Opahekeheke Island
Open Bay Islands
Ōtamahua / Quail Island
Pakatoa Island
Pakihi Island
Pararekau Island, Manukau Harbour
Pearl Island
Pepin Island (a tied island connected to the mainland)
Ponui Island
Poor Knights Islands
Portland Island
Pourewa Island
Puketutu Island
Putauhinu Island
Quarantine Island / Kamau Taurua
Rakino Island
Rakitu Island
Rangitoto Island
Rangitoto Islands, Marlborough Sounds
Rangitoto ki te Tonga / D'Urville Island
Raratoka Island
Resolution Island
Ripapa Island
Rotoroa Island
Rurima Rocks, including Rurima Island
Ruapuke Island
Secretary Island
Shark Island, Manukau Harbour
Shoe Island / Motuhoa
Simmonds Islands
Slipper Island
South Island
Stephens Island / Takapourewa
Stephenson Island
Stewart Island / Rakiura
Taieri Island / Moturata
Takangaroa Island
Taputeranga Island
Tarahiki Island
Tarakanahi Island
Tata Islands
Taukihepa / Big South Cape Island
Te Hauturu-o-Toi / Little Barrier Island
Te Motu-o-Kura / Bare Island
Te Hāwere-a-Maki / Goat Island
Tikitiki Island, (The Ninepin), Bay of Islands
Tiritiri Matangi Island
Tītī / Muttonbird Islands
Tonga Island
Ulva Island
Urupukapuka Island
Waiheke Island
Walker Island
Watchman Island
Whakaari / White Island
Whanganui Island
Whangaokeno / East Island
White Island (Otago)
Wiroa Island, Manukau Harbour

In rivers and lakes

Black Jacks Island (in Lake Benmore)
Channel Islands (in Lake Manapouri)
Dome Islands (in Lake Te Anau)
Entrance Island (in Lake Te Anau)
Fereday Island (in the Rakaia River delta)
Harwich Island (in Lake Wānaka)
Hidden Island (in Lake Wakatipu)
Inch Clutha (in the Clutha / Mata-Au delta)
Junction Island (in Lake Benmore)
Karihoa Island (in Waikato River)
Kaiwaka No.1 Island (in Waikato River delta)
Kaiwaka No.2 Island (in Waikato River delta)
Manutahi Island (in Waikato River)
Mary Island (in Lake Hauroko)
Mokoia Island (in Lake Rotorua)
Motakorea Island (in Waikato River)
Motuariki Island (in Lake Tekapo)
Motukakako Island (in Waikato River delta)
Motutaiko Island (in Lake Taupō)
Moutoa Island (in the Whanganui River)
Mou Tapu (in Lake Wānaka)
Mou Waho (in Lake Wānaka)
Motutieke Island (in Waikato River delta)
Namuheiriro Island (in Waikato River)
Ngāhinapōuri Island (in Waikato River delta)
Opuawhanga Island (in Waikato River)
Pigeon Island/Wāwāhi Waka (in Lake Wakatipu)
Pig Island/Mātau (in Lake Wakatipu)
Pomona Island (in Lake Manapouri)
Puehunui Island (in Waikato River delta)
Rakaia Island (in the Rakaia River delta)
Rangitata Island (in the Rangitata River delta)
Rona Island (in Lake Manapouri)
Ruby Island (in Lake Wānaka)
Silver Island (in Lake Hāwea)
Stevensons Island/Te Peka Karara (in Lake Wānaka)
Tarahanga Island (in Waikato River)
Tawanui Island (in Waikato River delta)
Te Kopura Island (in Waikato River)
Te Toki Island (in Waikato River)
Te Weranga Okapu Island (in Waikato River delta)
Tree Island (in Lake Wakatipu)
Whatamakiri Island (in Waikato River delta)

Outlying

New Zealand administers the following islands outside the main archipelago. Only the Chatham Islands have a permanent population although others also did in the past. Others host visitors for science, conservation, meteorological observation and tourism.
Chatham Islands
Chatham Island
Forty-Fours
Little Mangere Island
Mangere Island
Pitt Island
The Sisters
Rangatira Island
Star Keys
Kermadec Islands 
Cheeseman Island
Curtis Island
L'Esperance Rock
Macauley Island
Nugent Island
Raoul Island
Solander Islands
Solander Island
Little Solander Island
Pierced Rock
Manawatāwhi / Three Kings Islands
Manawatāwhi / Great Island
Oromaki / North East Island
Farmer Rocks
Moekawa / South West Island
Princes Islands
Ōhau / West Island

The New Zealand Subantarctic Islands are designated as a World Heritage Site.
Antipodes Islands
Antipodes Island
Bollons Island
Auckland Islands
Adams Island
Auckland Island
Disappointment Island
Enderby Island
Ewing Island
Rose Island
Bounty Islands
Campbell Island group
Campbell Island
Dent Island
Folly Island (or Folly Islands)
Jacquemart Island
The Snares
Broughton Island
North East Island
Western Chain

Realm of New Zealand
The following islands are part of the Realm of New Zealand, but are not part of New Zealand proper:
Cook Islands
Aitutaki
Atiu
Mangaia
Manihiki
Manuae
Mauke
Mitiaro
Nassau
Palmerston Island
Penrhyn Island/Tongareva
Pukapuka 
Rakahanga 
Rarotonga
Suwarrow
Takutea
Niue
Tokelau
Atafu
Nukunonu
Fakaofo

Territorial claims
New Zealand also claims the Ross Dependency in Antarctica, including:
the Balleny Islands
Buckle Island
Sabrina Island
Sturge Island
Young Island
Scott Island
Roosevelt Island
Coulman Island
the Ross Archipelago
Ross Island
Beaufort Island
White Island
Black Island
the Dellbridge Islands
Inaccessible Island
Tent Island
Big Razorback
Little Razorback

See also
List of islands
Geography of New Zealand
Extreme points of New Zealand

Notes

References

 
New Zealand
Islands